Thorncliffe or Thorncliff is the name of the following places:

In Canada
 Thorncliffe, Calgary
 Thorncliff, Edmonton
 Thorncliff, Ontario

In England
 Thorncliffe, Staffordshire
 Thorncliffe, West Yorkshire

See also 
 Thorncliffe Park
 Thorncliffe Park Raceway
 Thorncliffe Stable